Bull of Heaven is an American experimental/avant-garde group. The band originally consisted of Clayton Counts and Neil Keener, with help from various contributors. After Counts' death, Keener remains the only member left.

History

Formation: 2006–2009 

Both key members behind Bull of Heaven started with a variety of earlier projects. Neil Keener was (and in some cases, still is) involved with several punk rock and post-hardcore bands, including Planes Mistaken for Stars, Git Some, Red Cloud West, and Wovenhand. Clayton Counts was also involved in Git Some, before he and Neil moved from Chicago to Denver, where Bull of Heaven was founded. Counts also gained notoriety in September 2006 when he created a mash-up of The Beach Boys' Pet Sounds with The Beatles' Sgt. Pepper's Lonely Hearts Club Band, aptly titled Sgt. Petsound's Lonely Hearts Club Band and credited to the band The Beachles. Various blogs and news sites favoured it; however, Counts was issued with a cease and desist.

Bull of Heaven's first piece, 001: Weed Problem, was released on their site on January 31, 2008. The same time the following year, the band had already released more than fifty pieces, totalling nearly three hundred hours of music. Nearly all of Bull of Heaven's song titles are sourced from (sometimes obscure) literature. Even at this early stage in the band's history, they were already becoming known for their incredible song lengths; 019: Hypnosis, Drugs, and Mind Control (The Beginning: A Touch) is eight hours long, 028: Even to the Edge of Doom is twenty-four hours long, 044: A Corpse in My Arms on Awakening breaks the one-day mark at thirty-seven hours long, but is surpassed by 045: The Wicked Cease From Struggling which is one hundred sixty-eight hours long.

2009–2010 

Between April and May 2009, the band intermittently released a series of one hundred new songs, all named and numbered in Roman numerals. Pieces I – C were the first of several breaks from the band's standard three-digit numbering system of releasing music.

From September 2009 to January of the following year, the band also started releasing another new series, known as Alephs. The first ten of these contained roughly 1000–1100 pieces in each sub-folder. Aleph10 and Aleph11 contain one million and ten million pieces respectively.

The band gained some acknowledgement in December 2009, when they released 118: The Chosen Priest and Apostle of Infinite Space, a piece that is over two months long. Like many of their much longer pieces, the band supplied excerpt tracks; but in the case of 118, they supplied three.

In January 2010, Clayton Counts talked to The Fly about long players, discussing the various musicians that also delved into extremely long lengths of music, such as John Cage, Robert Rich, and even Wagner's Der Ring des Nibelungen. With this, the band continued creating pieces of equally extreme lengths; pieces 145–152 all range from fifty to one hundred fifty hours each.

In June 2010, the band created another new set of pieces different from the numbered, Aleph, and I – C pieces; this was a set of ten untitled folders, each containing thousands of short pieces, named as 32 digits of hexadecimal code. These pieces were not made public, and were only posted in the band's media sub-directory of their website.

In July 2010, the band released three very long pieces, the third of which gained them notoriety online, mainly in communities and discussion boards focused around finding the longest piece of music ever made. 208: As You Etch on the Inner Window of Your Eye is nine hundred sixteen hours long, 209: Blurred With Tears and Suffering Beyond Hope four thousand, seven hundred twenty-three hours long, but both are beaten by 210: Like a Wall in Which an Insect Lives and Gnaws, a piece lasting exactly fifty thousand hours.

2010–2013 
Between the end of 2010 and 2011, the band started creating various music puzzles, anti-music, and even lengthier pieces of music. Examples include MP3 files that are actually RAR archives, password-encrypted files, pieces embedded within other formats, such as PDF and EXE, pieces listed with negative song lengths, and a variety of SWF files.

In March 2011, the band released a series of pieces of extraordinary lengths. This series, ranging from their numerical ordering of 238–260, is similar to the Longplayer idea – each sound is the length of a prime number, and each subsequent piece creates near-infinite lengths of time before they're synchronized. The final in the series,  would last 8,462,937,602,125,701,219,674,955.2362595095 years before all the pieces synchronized.

In December 2011, two more extremely long pieces of music were released by the band. 286: 0 and 287: n, the first lasting over twenty-nine million hours, and the latter lasting more than eighty-seven trillion hours.

During 2012, the band only released three pieces of music: 288: Four Years Ago? Opium., something of an experimental hip-hop track; 289: CALCULOR, a calculator that doubles as a music generator; and 290: Two-Legged Tigers and Crocodiles, a sound collage piece. In July, the band's site had many downages, and 404 errors, leading to it eventually crashing completely. After a few months, however, the site returned and functionality resumed for the most part.

The band took a long hiatus until July 2013, at which time they released several hours of psychedelic rock.  It was announced via their Facebook page that more new music would be made available within the year.  In September they released a number of drone and post-rock tracks, and in November 299: Self-Traitor, I Do Bring the Spider Love, an hour and twenty minute long jazz fusion arrangement.  By the end of 2013, the band had uploaded most of their music to a public domain Internet Archive collection, where all of their newer works reside as they continue to rebuild a new website.

2014–present 
In early 2014, the band released a fan-made compilation of love songs, 300: Songs for Girls, followed by 301: Weed Problem II–V, and another extremely lengthy piece, 302: It is Part of Space and Time, which runs for at least 86,370,000,000 years.  Clayton Counts was interviewed by Vice in the Netherlands, discussing a range of topics related to the band and their sonic approach.

On April 24, 2014, psychedelic rock band The Flaming Lips included a reference to Bull of Heaven in the liner notes of the vinyl release of the condensed version of their 24 hr. long piece 7 Skies H3. The Flaming Lips mistakenly call the band "Bull in Heaven," but refer to their pieces 118: The Chosen Priest and Apostle of Infinite Space and 210: Like a Wall in Which an Insect Lives and Gnaws specifically.

On July 10, 2014, the band released 305: Hostages are Human Beings. On July 12, 2014, 303: n(k), 304: 0(2^18×5^18) and 306: It is Not a Lack of Love were released. On the very next day, they released several other tracks of various lengths. By the time, 310: ΩΣPx0(2^18×5^18)p*k*k*k is their longest release, and lasts for 3.343 quindecillion years.

In May 2016, Bull of Heaven were featured in a scholastic article entitled "Unperformable Works and the Ontology of Music" in the British Journal of Aesthetics, published by Oxford University Press.

On December 4, 2016, Bull of Heaven made a post on their Facebook page announcing the death of member Clayton Counts.

On September 12, 2018, Neil released the first new Bull of Heaven piece since Clayton's death, titled "Fight Night For The Ghosts Of Heaven."

Musical style 
Bull of Heaven is mostly known for its slow, lengthy, unchanging music. Usually the focus is around dark ambient, minimalism, and drone; however, the band is not limited to just these genres. 237: Disordered Before the Naked Picture of Despair is an avant-garde jazz loop. Similarly, 261: A Feeling for the Order Lying Behind the Appearance is a more traditional progressive rock/avant-garde jazz song. There are elements of spoken word, post-rock, harsh noise, modern classical, drone doom, and many more throughout the band's discography.

Live 
Bull of Heaven has only performed a handful of live shows, notably the Boris Afterparty in Denver in 2010 and at the Lemp Neighborhood Arts Center in St. Louis in 2014.

Discography
As of September 2022, Bull of Heaven has precisely 526 releases in their discography.

See also 
 Experimental music

References

External links 

 Bullofheaven.com Official website
 Bull of Heaven collection at the Internet Archive
 Bull of Heaven Tumblr
 Bull of Heaven Twitter
 Bull of Heaven Facebook page
 Partial discography at Discogs
 Interview at Musique Machine

Noise musical groups
American experimental musical groups
Musical groups from Denver
Drone metal musical groups
Musical groups established in 2008